The 2019 FIS Freestyle Ski and Snowboarding World Championships was held in Utah, in resorts Park City, Deer Valley and Solitude Mountain, from February 1 to 10, 2019.

19-year-old Dmitry Loginov of Russia became the youngest World Champion in Parallel Giant Slalom and the only snowboarder to win back-to-back events (parallel slalom and parallel giant slalom) in both junior and senior championships.

Schedule
28 events were held.

Medalists

Medal table

Freestyle skiing

Men

Women

Mixed

Snowboarding

Men

Women

Mixed

Notes

References

External links
Official website 

 
2019
2019 in freestyle skiing
2019
2019 in snowboarding
February 2019 sports events in the United States
2019 in American sports
2019 in sports in Utah
Winter sports competitions in the United States
Sports competitions in Utah